The Minister of State for Health and Secondary Care is a mid-level position in the Department of Health and Social Care in the British government. The position is currently held by Will Quince MP since 8 September 2022. The minister often deputises for the Secretary of State for Health and Social Care alongside the Minister of State for Social Care.

The office has been in place at least since 1969, with David Ennals as Secretary of State for Health and Social Security.

Historically, the role was known as Minister of State for Health and Social Security as part of the Department of Health and Social Security.

Responsibilities 
The minister is responsible for the following:

 COVID-19:
 NHS resilience (acute capacity)
 supply (ventilators)
 NHS operational performance
 Long Term Plan Bill
 finance, efficiency and commercial
 NHS capital, land and estates
 transformation
 NHS England mandate
 devolved administrations, Crown Dependencies and Overseas Territories
 secondary legislation
 departmental management
 EU future relationship and trade
 sponsorship of:
 NHSE
 NHSI

List of Ministers of State for Health

See also 

 Health minister

References 

Health ministers of the United Kingdom
Department of Health and Social Care
Health in the United Kingdom
National Health Service
COVID-19 pandemic in the United Kingdom